St Paul's Church is a Church of England parish church located on St Paul's Square in Bedford, Bedfordshire, England. Formerly a medieval collegiate church, the large building of cathedral proportions with its later additions and iconic spire dominates the town. St Paul's is the largest Anglican church in Bedfordshire, and the church exercises a ministry of welcome to thousands of visitors and pilgrims from far and wide each year. St Paul's is officially recognised as  a Major Parish Church and is a member of the Major Churches Network.

Historically, St Paul's has played a key part in the life of the British nation: as the home for the BBC's daily worship during the Second World War; and the Service for the National Day of Prayer in 1941, at which the then Archbishop of Canterbury, Cosmo Gordon Lang preached, was also broadcast to the UK and wider world from the church. St Paul's is today the Civic Church of the Borough of Bedford and the County of Bedfordshire; it is a focus for special commemorations and celebrations in the borough, county, and the wider region of the East of England, as well as being a central venue for concerts, recitals and exhibitions. As well as serving a diverse parish and ministering to a congregation of all ages, the church also enjoys fine choral and liturgical worship in the English cathedral tradition. It is a grade I listed building.

History

The first Minster 
Some evidence exists for the founding of St Paul's Church as a new minster by King Offa (d. AD 796) to serve the inhabitants of his new fortified urban burgh. Offa is understood to have been buried in Bedford, and his Minster Church of St Paul has been identified as a probable site of his grave. The church mentioned by name in the Domesday Book of 1086 was a house of secular canons in the eleventh century, ruled by an abbot in 971, and the church in which Oscytel (or Oskytel), Archbishop of York was buried in 956, indicating that St Paul's was an important minster church from at least the tenth century onwards.

The second and third churches 
From the early ninth century the priests’ mission was frequently interrupted by the invasions of the heathen Danes which continued at intervals until the arrival of the Normans in 1066. The Danes caused sporadic damage wherever they plundered or settled. They used the river to move inland to Bedford on their way westwards into the Saxon kingdoms of Mercia and Wessex, and in 1009-10 destroyed the church in the fighting. The Anglo-Saxon chronicles report that ‘forever they burnt as they went, then they turned back to the ships with their booty’.
 
Originally constructed in the early 13th century, the present church building has undergone numerous alterations, extensions, rebuilds and restorations since this time. An Early English south porch does survive from the original 13th-century structure, however, and records trace the existence of a previous Collegiate church on this site as far back as 1066. The Trinity Chapel of the church was first constructed in 1416, with maintenance of the chapel entrusted to the Holy Brotherhood of the Trinity. The church has long standing connections with Sir William Harpur and Dame Alice Harper, and the Trinity Chapel holds brasses of the couple. Sir William was the Lord Mayor of the City of London in 1562, and his Harpur Trust (which has a long history of operating independent schools in Bedford) has donated many of the stained glass windows in the church. Other improvements in the 15th century included Misericords in the Quire (or chancel) and two additional porches. The Trinity Chapel was used as an Archdeacon’s Court after the English Reformation.

On 23 May 1656, John Bunyan, the Christian preacher and author of "The Pilgrim's Progress", preached at St. Paul's. John Wesley, the Anglican cleric and Christian theologian (also one of the founders of Methodism) preached the Assize Sermon at the church on 10 March 1758. During the 19th century St Paul's adopted the Anglo-Catholic tradition of the Church of England, where it remains. In 1864 the Revd Michael Ferrebee Sadler was appointed taking over from the Reverend John Donne. Sadler was to encourage Fanny Eagles to become a deaconess. As a result, the Sisters of Saint Etheldreda began to be associated with the parish from 1869. Architectural work to the church in the 19th century includes the tower and spire, transepts, choir stalls, quire and quire roof.

Early 20th-century work to the church includes the Rood screen (designed by George Frederick Bodley), the English Altar and altar rails (designed by the Bromsgrove Guild), and restoration work to the Trinity Chapel (instituted by C. E. Mallows). Later in the 20th century, from the mid-1970s to 1982, the church was restored and otherwise improved. In 2014 new work was completed on a Narthex at the west end of the church.

The church for the nation 1941-5 

St Paul's moved centre stage nationally to play two special roles at a time when the United Kingdom faced its darkest hour.

First, when during the Second World War, the BBC moved much of its operations out of London to Bedford, the Trinity Chapel in St Paul's was used by the BBC as the studio for broadcasting the Daily Service and The Epilogue both nationally and throughout Europe. This extraordinary period in the church's history is fittingly commemorated by an inscription on the floor at the entrance of the chapel:

THE BBC BROADCAST THE CHRISTIAN MESSAGE FROM THIS CHAPEL 1941-1945 IN THE DARKNESS OF WAR:

NATION SHALL SPEAK PEACE UNTO NATION

THEY SHALL BEAT THEIR SWORDS INTO PLOUGHSHARES

HOPE THROUGH RECONCILIATION

FORGIVENESS THROUGH UNDERSTANDING

PEACE

		
Secondly, at the southern end of the high altar rail, an inscription on a wooden panel records the National Day of Prayer on Sunday 7 September 1941, when the Archbishops of both Canterbury and York came together to St Paul's, Bedford to lead the worship and broadcast live to the nation at a grim time in its history. The service was broadcast to all parts of the world, to uplift and inspire 'many millions to a new endeavour to set up a kingdom of righteousness on the earth'. The church was also home to a service led by Roman Catholic Cardinal Arthur Hinsley.

Notable features

The organ
The present three manual instrument is the result of a rebuild in 2010. Although several of the 1985 tonal additions have been retained, the tonal basis of the present instrument is formed by the Norman & Beard pipework of 1900. In the 2010 rebuild all of the chorus reeds were re-voiced with a brighter tone so as to integrate with the original work. Three new replacement Mixtures and a Tuba were added to the specification and the number of stops was reduced from 66 stops down to 44, exactly the same number as in 1900. The specification may be viewed on the church website or on the National Pipe Organ Register.

The bells
The church has had a ring of bells for centuries.  Currently there are twelve bells, hung for English-style change ringing.  The majority of the bells were cast in 1896–7 to form a new ring of ten to replace the eight that had been in the church since around 1744, one of these original bells was retained as the ninth of the new ten, but was recast in 1945.  The bells had been taken out of the tower during the Second World War, in case the church was damaged by bombing (ringing of church bells was forbidden for much of the war, reserved as an alarm in case of invasion), and were rehung in 1945.  In 1977, two new bells were added, to give the present twelve, these marked the Silver Jubilee of Elizabeth II.

The church today
St Paul's is a busy and active Church of England parish, Civic and County church in the heart of Bedford, working together with three other Anglican churches in a common witness to the community.  As well as serving a most diverse parish, the church supports the work of schools, voluntary and community organisations through the county and East of England, as well as the work of the Lord-Lieutenant and High Sheriff. St Paul's enjoys a cathedral choral tradition within a modern 'catholic' liturgy with appeal to all ages. The team of clergy and lay ministers is augmented by a full-time Pastoral Assistant working with those in special need seeking help from the church, as well as the many visitors throughout the year. The Church is part of the ecumenical 'Town Centre Churches' and has many links to other churches and community groups, including the 'Bedford Council of Faiths'. The church is a member of the Major Churches Network and of Cathedrals Plus.

Sunday services
8.00 Holy Communion

according to the Book of Common Prayer10.15 Parish EucharistAll Age Sung Eucharist with Address (1st Sunday)
Sung Parish Eucharist with Address (2nd, 4th and 5th Sundays)
Choral Eucharist with Address (3rd Sunday)

The ministry of prayer for healing is offered on the 4th Sunday5.30 Evening ServiceAddress and Compline (1st Sunday)
Choral Evensong with short address (2nd and 4th Sundays)
Evening Prayer - said (3rd and 5th Sundays)

Weekday servicesMonday   
9.00 a.m. Morning Prayer; 4.30 p.m. Evening PrayerTuesday 
9.00 a.m. Morning Prayer; 4.30 p.m. Evening PrayerWednesday 
9.00 a.m. Morning Prayer;  Noon Eucharist, followed by bring and share lunch; 5.00 p.m. Evening PrayerThursday 
9.00 a.m. Morning Prayer; 4.30 p.m. Evening PrayerFriday 
9.00 a.m. Morning Prayer; 9.30 a.m. Eucharist; 4.30 p.m. Evening PrayerSaturday' 
9.00 a.m. Morning Prayer; 9.30 a.m. Eucharist; 4.30 p.m. Evening Prayer

The church opens every day for private prayer from 10.00 a.m. to 4.00 p.m.

 Vicars of St Paul's

Prior to 1528 the church was served by the Priory and Canons of the Blessed Virgin May and St Paul's Newnham. A Vicarage was established in 1528

1528 John Berde
1550 Reginald West STB
1554 Henry Atkinson
1555 Edward Tailor
1562 Emere Bedforde
1572 Ralph Jones STB
1584 Edward Noke
1601 Andrew Dennys MA
1606 John Beamont MA
1617 Theodore Crowley MA
1633 George Smithe MA
1638 John Bradshaw
 (1640 living sequestered)''
1662 Robert Guidott MA
1664 John Wilson STB
1666 John Bradshaw
1671 Richard Pearson MA
1672 William Jackson STB
1673 Arthur Humphreys MA
1677 Edward Bourne MA
1689 Alexander Leith MA
1732 Francis Hunt BA
1738 Robert Lambe BA
1749 William Smith BA
1782 John Hemsted MA
1824 James Donne MA
1861 William George Fitzgerald MA
1864 Michael Ferrebee Sadler MA
1870 Robert Aitken Bennett BA
1877 Robert Edward Reginald Watts MA
1886 Lambert Woodard MA
1913 Jocelyn Henry Speck MA
1922 William Aubrey Robins MA
1936 Alan St George Colthurst MA
1946 Cyril Patrick Hankey MA
1951 Cyril Francis Leolin Hilditch AKC
1954 John Humphrey King MBE MA
1969 Robert Saville Brown MA
1974 Basil Henry Jones
1975 Nicholas Guy Coulton BD
1990 Christopher Paul Collingwood MA BMus
1998 John Glanville Pedlar BA
2014 Kevin Ian Goss MA GRSM LRAM LTCL LGSM

See also
The Rogue's March

References

External links
 St Paul's Church official site

Saint Paul's Church
Church of England church buildings in Bedfordshire
Grade I listed churches in Bedfordshire
Anglo-Catholic church buildings in Bedfordshire